Recilia raoi is a species of leafhopper from the family Cicadellidae. It is endemic to India.

References

Recilia
Hemiptera of Asia
Insects of India
Endemic fauna of India
Insects described in 1998